Convincingly Better is the debut album by Maltese singer Claudia Faniello. It was released on 20 August 2010 from CAP-Sounds.

Track listing 
"I'm Dangerous" – 3:06
"I Hate This Song" – 3:11
"I Want My Love Back" – 4:00
"I Need To Know" – 3:42
"Dilemma" – 3:02
"Convincingly Better" – 3:25
"Samsara" – 3:04
"Guardami" – 3:42
"Midas Touch" – 2:54
"Walk With Me" – 3:46
"I Hate This Song" (Club Mix) – 4:25

Singles 
 "I Hate This Song" was released in August 2010.
 "Samsara" was released in February 2010. It participated in The GO Malta Eurosong 2010.

Release history

References 

2010 debut albums
Claudia Faniello albums